Salopek is a surname, originally Serbo-Croatian.

It is the second most common surname in the Karlovac County of Croatia.

Notable people with the surname include:

 Emanuela Salopek (born 1987), Croatian basketball player
 Paul Salopek (born 1962), American journalist and writer
 Steven Salopek (born 1985), Croatian Australian rules footballer

References

Serbian surnames
Croatian surnames